Maria Stern may refer to:

 Maria Stern (poker player)
 Maria Stern (singer-songwriter)

See also
 Maria Stein
 Maria Steen
 Maria Sten